Safaricom PLC is a listed Kenyan mobile network operator headquartered at Safaricom House in Nairobi, Kenya. It is the largest telecommunications provider in Kenya, and one of the most profitable companies in the East and Central Africa region. The company offers mobile telephony, mobile money transfer, consumer electronics, ecommerce, cloud computing, data, music streaming, and fibre optic services. It is most renowned as the home of MPESA, a mobile banking SMS-based service.

Safaricom controls approximately 64.5% percent of the Kenyan market as of 2020 with a subscriber base estimated at approximately 35.6 million.

In terms of voice market and SMS market share Safaricom controls 69.2% and 92.2% respectively.

Safaricom was formed in 1997 as a fully owned subsidiary of Telkom Kenya. In May 2000, Vodafone Group PLC of the United Kingdom acquired a 40% stake and management responsibility for the company. In 2008, the government offered 25% of its shares to the public through the Nairobi Securities Exchange.

Safaricom was ranked as Africa's Best Employer, 67th in the World by the Forbes Global 200 list of the World's Best Employers. In March 2018, Safaricom was ranked as the #1 company to work for in the annual BrighterMonday Best 100 Companies to Work for in Kenya according to career professionals and job seekers.

As of 2020, Safaricom employed over 4,500 people permanently and over 1,900 people on contract. 75 percent of the company's employees were based in Nairobi, the Headquarters, with the remainder based in other big cities like Mombasa, Kisumu, Nakuru and Eldoret, in which it operates retail outlets. It has nationwide dealerships to ensure customers across the country have access to its products and services.

In November 2012, Safaricom partnered NCBA Bank and came up with a revolutionary banking product, M-Shwari, which allows M-Pesa customers to save and borrow money through mobile phone while earning interest on money saved tapping into an underdeveloped financial services market.

Michael Joseph served as the founding CEO between July 2000 and November 2010. He transformed the telecom from a subscriber base of less than 20,000 to over 16.71 million during his previous tenure. In his last full year as CEO, Safaricom posted a 37 percent rise in pretax profit.

Bob Collymore took over at Safaricom in November 2010, replacing Michael Joseph who currently sits in the telco giant’s board as the Chairman. Collymore oversaw the introduction into the market of various mobile money products that have given the company leverage among its competitors. Collymore was also been at the forefront in leading the charge against regulatory efforts to clip the company’s wings due to its size and dominance. After a two-year battle with cancer, Bob, the longest-serving executive died on July 1st 2019 leaving behind a company with doubled user base and profits increased by 380%. Michael was appointed as interim chief. 

Peter Ndegwa was appointed as CEO effective April 1st, 2020.

In January 2023, Safaricom brought Adil Khawaja to the position of chairman of the board of directors..

History
2G service on 900 MHz and 1800 MHz. 3G DC-HSPA+ service on 900 MHz & 2100 MHz. Safaricom later launched LTE-A (4G service with carrier aggregation) service in Nairobi and Mombasa on band 20 (800 MHz) and band 3 (1800 MHz) in December 2014 and has expanded to other cities. Safaricom's competitors, Airtel Kenya and Telkom Kenya have expressed dissatisfaction with the way the regulatory body Communications Authority of Kenya, awarded Safaricom its LTE (long Term Evolution) license to operate at 800 MHz.

Safaricom was the first company in Kenya to possess 3G Internet technology with the recent success of 4G / LTE connectivity currently in all major Kenyan cities. In March 2021, Safaricom became the second network operator in Africa after Vodacom to launch a live 5G network, initially available in Nairobi, Kisumu, Kakamega and Kisii.

Flashback service (Please Call Me)
Most of Safaricom's network congestion emerges from a practice called 'flashing'. Flashing is the practice of calling another mobile user, but disconnecting before the connected call is answered. It provides a method for mobile users to alert someone that they wish to be called, but either can't, or won't, pay for the call. The method is cost-free for the users; but costly in network bandwidth. That is why Safaricom introduced a flashback service that gave every subscriber five free SMS messages with a single predefined message stating "Please call me. Thank you". Although the messages can be annoying when sent just for fun they can prove useful when one is in trouble and has no airtime. It also gives parents more of a reason to get mobile phones for their children without the real need for getting them airtime.

Kipokezi service
Safaricom launched the Kipokezi service in May 2000 that enabled its subscribers to send and receive email and online chat through standard mobile phones. The service does not require users to have an Internet connection as it uses ForgetMeNot Africa’s Handset Initiation technology. Prior to the service fewer than one in ten Kenyans had accessed the Internet but the Kipokezi launch allowed more than a third of the population to exchange email and online chat messages.

Lipa Mdogo Mdogo 
In Partnership with Google, Safaricom introduced Lipa Mdogo Mdogo, a product targeting individuals with 2G phones by upgrading them to 4 G-enabled devices while paying daily installments of Ksh.20 over a period of one year.

Ndegwa who's the CEO of the company pointed out that they are  targeting 1 million customers with plans of rolling the service to other countries depending on its initial success.

M-PESA

History 
An M-PESA-enabled mobile phone can also function as an electronic wallet and can hold up to KSh.145,000/= (approx. US$1,000). Safaricom has announced that it intends to roll out M-PESA to other countries.

M-PESA (M for mobile, pesa is Swahili for money) is a mobile phone-based money transfer, financing and micro financing service, launched in 2007 by Vodafone for Safaricom and Vodacom. M-PESA was originally designed as a system to allow microfinance-loan repayments to be made by phone, reducing the costs associated with handling cash. After the pilot testing it was broadened to become a general money-transfer scheme. since then safaricom M-PESA brand has reached 12 countries in Africa and three countries outside the continent.

How it works 

Once a user registers for M-PESA, they pay money into the system by handing cash at an M-Pesa agent, who then credits the money to the user's M-Pesa account. The user then gets an SMS notifying them of the transaction.

A user withdraws money by visiting an agent, who checks that the user has sufficient funds before debiting the user's account and handing over the cash. An M-Pesa user can also transfer money to others using a menu on their phone. Cash can thus be sent one place to another instantly, safely and easily.  This is in contrast to the preferred system before where money was sent by a porter, usually a friend, relative or bus crew, to the intended recipient.

M-PESA was first launched by the Kenyan mobile network operator Safaricom, where Vodafone was technically a minority shareholder (40%), in March 2007. M-PESA quickly captured a significant market share for cash transfers and grew to 17 million subscribers by December 2011 in Kenya alone

The growth of the service forced formal banking institutions to take note of the new venture. In December 2008, a group of banks reportedly lobbied the Kenyan finance minister to audit M-PESA, in an effort to at least slow the growth of the service. This ploy failed, as the audit found that the service was robust. At this time, The Banking Act did not provide the basis to regulate products offered by non-banks, of which M-PESA was one such very successful product. As at November 2014, M-PESA transactions for the 11 months of 2014 were valued at KSh.2.1 trillion/=, a 28% increase from 2013, and almost half the value of the country's GDP.

On November 19, 2014, Safaricom launched a companion android app Safaricom M-Ledger for its M-PESA users. The application, currently available only on Android, gives M-PESA users a historical view of all their transactions.

M-Pesa’s usage and success in Kenya 

M-Pesa has been particularly successful in Kenya, compared to mobile money platforms in other countries. Contributing factors here include the exceptionally high cost of sending money by other methods; the dominant market position of Safaricom; the regulator's initial decision to allow the scheme to proceed on an experimental basis, without formal approval; a clear and effective marketing campaign (“Send money home”); an efficient system to move cash around behind the scenes; and, the post-election violence in the country in early 2008.

During the post-election violence, M-Pesa was used to transfer money to people trapped in Nairobi's slums at the time. Some Kenyans regarded M-PESA as a safer place to store their money than the banks, which were entangled in ethnic disputes. Having established a base of initial users, M-PESA then benefited from network effects: the more people who used it, the more it made sense for others to sign up for it.

M-PESA has since been extended to offer loans and savings products, and can also be used to disburse salaries or pay bills, which saves users further time and money as compared to doing so from banks.

M-PESA has a wide range of financial services including Person to Person, ATM withdrawal, Payments, Bulk Payments and Bank to M-PESA

As of January 2016, M-Pesa is used by 21.8 million Kenyans, with over 1.5 million of M-Pesa users using the bill payment feature. At the time M-Pesa had a network of over 90,000 agent outlets.

Average value of monthly person to person transfers on M-Pesa was KSh.106 billion/= while Person to Business transfers were at KSh.23.5 billion/= and Business to Person at KSh 27.8 billion/= per month.

M-Pesa is in partnership with a number of banks. M-Shwari and KCB M-Pesa are two such services, which provide access to savings and loans to users.  M-Shwari was launched in November 2012 in partnership with Commercial Bank Of Africa.

Safaricom and Visa partnership 
Safaricom and VISA in June 2022 launched an M-PESA Visa virtual card that allows Kenyan users to shop for products and pay for services worldwide, facilitating safe cashless payments at merchant locations in over 200 countries via Visa’s global network.

Elsewhere

South Africa 

In September 2010 Vodacom and Ned bank announced the launch of the service in South Africa, where there were estimated to be more than 13 million "economically active" people without a bank account. M-PESA has been slow to gain a toehold in the South African market compared to Vodacom's projections that it would sign up 10 million users in the following three years. By May 2011, it had registered approximately 100,000 customers. The gap between expectations for M-PESA's performance and its actual performance can be partly attributed to differences between the Kenyan and South African markets, including the banking regulations at the time of M-PESA's launch in each country. According to Money Web, a South African investment website, "A tough regulatory environment with regards to customer registration and the acquisition of outlets also compounded the company's troubles, as the local regulations are more stringent in comparison to our African counterparts. Lack of education and product understanding also hindered efforts in the initial roll out of the product." In June 2011, Vodacom and Nedbank launched a campaign to re-position M-PESA, targeting the product to potential customers who have a higher Living Standard Measures (LSM) index than were first targeted.]

Despite efforts, as at March 2015, M-PESA still struggled to grow its customer base. This comes as no surprise as South Africa is well known for being ahead of financial institutions globally in terms of maturity and technological innovation. According to Genesis Analytics, 70% of South Africans are "banked", meaning that they have at least one bank account with an established financial institution which have their own banking products which directly compete with the M-PESA offering.

Tanzania 
M-PESA was launched in Tanzania by Vodacom in 2008 but its initial ability to attract customers fell short of expectations. In 2010, the International Finance Corporation released a report which explored many of these issues in greater depth and analyzed the strategic changes that Vodacom has implemented to improve their market position.[23] As of September 2021, M-PESA in Tanzania has 12.66 million subscribers

India 
M-PESA, was launched in India as a close partnership between Vodafone India and ICICI bank in November 2011 under the leadership of Mr Suresh Sethi. The service today operates in all telecom circles where Vodafone India is present. Users (of any telecom operator) can activate the M-Pesa service by downloading the Vodafone M-Pesa app (available on all app stores) on to their phones and registering themselves or by visiting any Vodafone store, Vodafone mini-store or M-Pesa agent point across the country. Customers of Vodafone can also activate the M-Pesa service by dialing *400# from their mobiles and completing the registration process. Using the *400# (USSD) facility allows Vodafone customers to avail of the benefits of M-Pesa without having a smartphone or a data connection. Registration is entirely free of charge.

A customer who activates his M-pesa wallet by only providing his basic demographic details and not sharing any proof of identity is enabled as a minimum KYC customer on M-Pesa. A minimum KYC customer of M-Pesa can not do money transfer (P2B, P2P) from his wallet account but can avail services like recharges (Prepaid mobile/DTH), bill payments, merchant payments, EMI payments, utility payments, insurance payments etc. They also have a monthly /daily/per transaction limit of ₨.10,000/-.  If a minimum KYC M-Pesa customer wants to avail of bank transfer facility/increase his or her monthly transaction limit, then he or she can do so by doing their KYC using their Aadhar at any Vodafone store or M-Pesa agent point.

M-Pesa in India operates under two licenses, the PPI (Prepaid Payment Instruments) license issued by the Reserve Bank of India and the business correspondent license issued by ICICI bank. M-Pesa has also received in -principle nod of the regulator to set up a payments bank in India. Vodafone M-Pesa is the largest business correspondent channel in India with 1.5 lac+ M-Pesa agents who are enabled to provide cash-in, cash-out and assisted payments facility to M-Pesa customers.

Shareholding 
In 2008, reports appearing in the cross section of the press indicated that Vodafone Plc of UK only owned 35% while the remaining 5% was owned by a little-known company, Mobitelea Ventures Limited. The reports caused a stir which led to the summoning of its CEO Michael Joseph to appear before the PIC "Public Investment Committee", where he denied knowing who the other shareholder is. A spokesman for Vodafone said "the PIC has no powers to investigate M&A activity (see Mergers and Acquisitions), only to ask to view company accounts of Vodafone Kenya Limited, a company registered in Kenya. Mobitelea Ventures Limited were granted an option to purchase 25% of Vodafone's shares which they completed in 2002, Vodafone bought back half of the stake in 2003 for $10 million, and in the financial year ending 31 March 2009 purchased the remaining indirect equity stake of 5%, thus returning Vodafone to its original 40% stake-holding. Vodafone said that whilst it would like to disclose who owns Mobitelea it is unable to because of a confidentiality agreement.

, the company's stock was owned by the following public and private entities. The stock of the company is listed on the Nairobi Stock Exchange, where it trades under the symbol: SCOM.

See also

 Global Partnership for Ethiopia
Mobitelea Ventures Limited
 List of mobile network operators in Kenya

References

 
Telecommunications companies of Kenya
Companies based in Nairobi
Companies listed on the Nairobi Securities Exchange
1997 establishments in Kenya
Telecommunications companies established in 1997
Kenyan brands
Vodafone
Mobile phone companies of Kenya